Melanitis ansorgei, the blue evening brown, is a butterfly in the family Nymphalidae. It is found in Ivory Coast, Cameroon, the Central African Republic, the north-east of the Democratic Republic of the Congo, and Uganda (from the western part of the country to the Bwamba Valley). The habitat consists of forests.

Taxonomy
Unpublished DNA studies suggest the species may need to be placed in a new genus, since it appears to be more closely related to Gnophodes than to Melanitis.

References

External links
NSG database Melanitis ansorgei Rothschild 1904 image

ansorgei
Butterflies of Africa
Lepidoptera of West Africa
Insects of the Central African Republic
Butterflies described in 1904